Nights Are Forever is the fourth album by the pop rock duo England Dan & John Ford Coley. It was the pair's breakthrough album. "I'd Really Love to See You Tonight" became one of their biggest hits, peaking at #2 on the Billboard Hot 100. The follow-up single, "Nights Are Forever Without You," also proved successful, peaking at #10.

Production
The album was produced by Kyle Lehning. Both top ten singles were written by Parker McGee.

Critical reception

Joe Viglione write on Allmusic, "Nights Are Forever was the breakthrough album for Dan Seals and John Coley after some sincere and excellent work on A&M Records in the early '70s. Two of their biggest hits were the title track and the beautiful "I'd Really Love to See You Tonight." Those songs are a good indication of the fine performances this 1976 album contains. The duo's originals like "Long Way Home" and the Dan Fogelberg-ish "Westward Wind" could have been hits as well displaying superb musicianship and delicate vocals." He also praises the work of songwriter Parker McGee as well as producer Kyle Lehning.
The Rolling Stone Album Guide wrote that "these guys managed always to sound like oafish bores breaking their backs to be 'sensitive.'"

Track listing

"I'd Really Love to See You Tonight" (Parker McGee) - 2:39
"I'll Stay" (Dan Seals) - 3:20 
"Westward Wind" (Seals, Coley) - 3:17
"Long Way Home" (Seals, Coley) - 3:18
"There'll Never Be Another For Me" (Seals, McGee, Coley) - 2:50
"Nights Are Forever Without You" (McGee) - 2:52
"It's Not The Same" (Seals, Coley, Sunny Dalton) - 2:38
"Showboat Gambler" (Seals) - 2:37
"The Prisoner" (Seals, Coley) - 3:35
"Lady" (Seals, McGee, Coley, Kyle Lehning) - 3:58 
"Everything's Gonna Be Alright" (Seals, Coley) - 3:08

Personnel
 Dan Seals – lead vocals, acoustic guitar, soprano saxophone 
 John Ford Coley – lead vocals, acoustic guitar, keyboards
 Steve Gibson – acoustic guitar, electric guitar, mandolin 
 Jim Seals – acoustic guitar, banjo 
 Bobby Thompson – acoustic guitar 
 Doyle Grisham – steel guitar 
 Shane Keister – keyboards 
 Kyle Lehning – bass 
 Joe Osborn – bass
 Ted Reynolds – bass
 Larrie Londin – drums, percussion 
 Dennis Good – trombone 
 George Cunningham – trumpet 
 Don Sheffield – trumpet
 Billy Puett – woodwinds 
 Denis Solee – woodwinds
 Warren Hartman – string arrangements (1, 7)
 Bergen White – horn and string arrangements (4, 5, 6, 11)
 The Shelly Kurland String Section – strings 
 Janie Frickie – backing vocals 
 Ginger Holiday – backing vocals 
 Sheri Kramer – backing vocals 
 Lisa Silver – backing vocals 
 Diane Tidwell – backing vocals

Production
 Producer and Engineer – Kyle Lehning
 Sound Consultant – Jon Yeaworth
 Recorded and Mixed at Studio By The Pond (Hendersonville, TN).
 Mastered by Mac Evans and Glenn Meadows at Masterfonics (Nashville, TN).
 Photography – Slick Lawson

Chart singles

References

1976 albums
England Dan & John Ford Coley albums
Albums produced by Kyle Lehning
Big Tree Records albums